"Zero" is a song by Italian singer Mahmood. It was released as a digital download and for streaming on 21 April 2021 by Island Records. The song was written by Alessandro Mahmoud, Davide Petrella and Dardust, and produced by Dardust.

It was part of the soundtrack of Netflix's series Zero and was included in Mahmood's second album Ghettolimpo.

Personnel
Credits adapted from Tidal.
 Dardust – producer and composer
 Davide Petrella – author
 Mahmood – associated performer, author, vocals

Track listing

Charts

References

2021 singles
2021 songs
Island Records singles
Mahmood (singer) songs
Songs written by Dario Faini
Songs written by Mahmood
Songs written by Davide Petrella